Monospitovo is a village in the municipality of Bosilovo, North Macedonia. It used to be part of the former municipality of Murtino. It has about 750 houses and most of the people live permanently abroad.

Demographics
According to the 2002 census, the village had a total of 1,803 inhabitants. Ethnic groups in the village include:

Macedonians 1,799
Turks 1
Serbs 2
Others 1

References

External links
 Visit Macedonia

Villages in Bosilovo Municipality